Gaira is a small town on the Caribbean coast of Colombia. Near the port of Santa Marta, it is also well known for El Rodadero, one of the most popular beaches in Colombia.

Populated places in the Magdalena Department